J. Beez Wit the Remedy is the third album by the Jungle Brothers, released in 1993 on Warner Bros. Records.

Background
The album was the result of much label trouble, with Warner Bros. consistently rejecting the group's offerings. It was originally titled Crazy Wisdom Masters, and contained some experimental hip-hop for the time, as well as production from Bill Laswell. Though the final album is more conventional, experimental tracks remain, including a few from the Crazy Wisdom Masters sessions (e.g. "Spittin' Wicked Randomness", "For The Headz At Company Z"). Tracks from the Wisdom sessions were released in 1999.

Critical reception
The Virginian-Pilot thought that "the super-stompin' '40 Below Trooper' and 'I'm in Love With Indica' are some of the most exciting music of the summer, and raise the inventiveness quotient of this vivid, good-humored rap set several notches." The Guardian deemed the album the definitive example of "out rap," writing that the "scorched, gnarled noise, non-aligned beats and furiously choked vocals are nicely summed up in the song title 'Spittin Wicked Randomness'." 

Trouser Press wrote that "with its harder and more aggressive sound, the album simply doesn’t have the creative spark or infectiously happy-go-lucky vibe that distinguished Done by the Forces of Nature." MTV called J Beez wit the Remedy "the clangiest, most disjointed hip-hop affair ever recorded." The Spin Alternative Record Guide wrote: "Throwing it all away with a haphazardness that reveals the likes of Onyx as the sitcom puppets they are, the Jungle Brothers are back reinventing hip hop."

Track listing

"40 Below Trooper" – 3:57
"Book of Rhyme Pages" – 4:44
"My Jimmy Weighs a Ton" – 3:37
"Good Ole Hype Sh.." – 3:31
"Blahbludify" – 2:33
"Spark a New Flame" – 4:24
"I'm in Love With Indica" – 4:14
"Simple as That" – 3:53
"All I Think About Is You" – 4:08
"Good Lookin Out" – 3:31
"JB's Comin Through" – 1:57
"Spittin Wicked Randomness" – 3:32
"For the Headz at Company Z" – 3:08
"Manmade Material" – 3:11

Personnel
Jungle Brothers	 - 	Design, Reproduction
Robert Power	 - 	Executive Producer, Mixing
Doug DeAngelis	 - 	Engineer
Oz Fritz	 - 	Engineer
Deborah Norcross	 - 	Design
Enrique Badulescu       -      Photography
Jeff Gold	 - 	Art Direction
Nancy Ogami     -      Typography

Singles

References

Jungle Brothers albums
1993 albums
Warner Records albums